Cabo de Hornos National Park is a protected area in southern Chile that was designated a Biosphere Reserve by UNESCO in 2005, along with Alberto de Agostini National Park. The world's southernmost national park, it is located 12 hours by boat from Puerto Williams in the Cape Horn Archipelago, which belongs to the Commune of Cabo de Hornos in the Antártica Chilena Province of Magallanes y Antártica Chilena Region.

The park was created in 1945 and includes the Wollaston Islands and the Hermite Islands.

Origins 

The region of Cabo de Hornos (Cape Horn) was discovered by the Dutch merchant Isaac Le Maire on January 29, 1616, and was named Hoorn after the Dutch city where the expedition came from. The national park was created on April 26, 1945, by the Chilean Ministry of Agriculture.

Geography 

It comprises a series of the islands and islets that make up the archipelago, including the main landmasses of the Wollaston and Hermite Islands.The park is the southernmost piece of Chilean territory, except for the Chilean Antarctic Territory which is in dispute.

Climate 

The climate in the park is generally cool, owing to the southern latitude. There are 278 days of rainfall (70 days of snow) and 2000 mm of annual rainfall

Cloud coverage is generally extensive, with averages from 5.2 eighths in May and July to 6.4 eighths in December and January. Wind conditions are generally severe, particularly in winter. In summer, the wind at Cape Horn is gale force up to 5% of the time, with generally good visibility; however, in winter, gale-force winds occur up to 30% of the time, often with poor visibility.

Flora 

The terrain is almost entirely treeless peat and its main characteristic is the presence of tuberous vegetable formations covered in low dense  Poaceaes (Gramineae), lichen and mosses that are resistant to the low temperatures and harsh weather. In some parts, small wooded areas of Antarctic beech or nire, lenga, winter's bark or canelo, and Magellanic coigüe can be found.

Fauna 

As with the flora, fauna in the park is scarce and many of the species are endangered. The fauna is dominated by birds and maritime mammals. Bird species found on the islands include: Magellanic penguin (Spheniscus magellanicus),  or red peek penguin, the southern giant petrel (Macronectes giganteus), kelp gull or Dominican gull (Larus dominicanus), red-legged cormorant (Poikilocarbo gaimardi, also known as the red-legged shag, red-footed cormorant, red-footed shag, Gaimard's cormorant or grey cormorant), and southern royal albatross (Diomedea epomophora).

Mammal species found in the park include: marine otter (Lontra felina, known locally as chungungo), leopard seal (Hydrurga leptonyx), Chilean dolphin (Cephalorhynchus eutropia, also known as the black dolphin or tonina), Burmeister's porpoise (Phocoena spinipinnis), Peale's dolphin (Lagenorhynchus australis) and humpback whale (Megaptera novaeangliae).

See also
 Cape Horn Biosphere Reserve
 Cape Horn

References

External links

Biosphere reserves of Chile
National parks of Chile
Protected areas of Magallanes Region
Protected areas established in 1945
1945 establishments in Chile
Magellanic subpolar forests